Herbert James Hill (12 February 1867 – 27 February 1946) was an English first-class cricketer.

Hill was born at Kingston upon Thames in February 1867. He made his debut in minor counties cricket for Hertfordshire in the 1895 Minor Counties Championship. He made two appearances in first-class cricket for the Marylebone Cricket Club, playing against London County at Crystal Palace in 1900 and Oxford University at Lord's in 1901. He scored 90 runs in his two first-class matches, with a high score of 54 against London County. He played minor counties cricket for Hertfordshire until 1903, making a total of 42 appearances in the Minor Counties Championship. By profession he was a stockbroker. Hill died in February 1946 at Sheringham, Norfolk. His brother-in-law, William Law, was also a first-class cricketer.

References

External links

1867 births
1946 deaths
Cricketers from Kingston upon Thames
English cricketers
Hertfordshire cricketers
Marylebone Cricket Club cricketers
English stockbrokers